Cyclanthera brachystachya, the exploding cucumber (but not to be confused with Ecballium elaterium), in the cucurbit or gourd family (Cucurbitaceae), is a herbaceous vine usually grown for its curiosity value, but the fruit is also edible.

The unusual fruit are bilaterally symmetrical, bulbous and spiny.  They explode when ripe as a means of seed dispersal.

Origin and distribution

The plant is endemic from Southern Mexico through Colombia and Ecuador.

Food uses
The fruit can be used raw when small (less than 2 cm) in salads, or cooked when mature (2.5 cm, exploded).

Cultivation
It is propagated by its puzzle piece -shaped seed, and grown in conditions similar to other cucurbits like cucumbers and melons. It prefers warm, hot climates with regular watering. Once established the vine can grow quickly up to 10–15 feet.  Although preferably grown over some kind of support, it can also be grown along the ground.  The plant produces both male and female flowers on the same plant in mid-summer.

Photos

References

External links

brachystachya
Articles containing video clips